is a Japanese professional golfer who plays on the PGA Tour and Japan Golf Tour.

While playing on the Japan Golf Tour, Kodaira has had seven victories, including two Japan Golf Tour majors, the 2013 Japan Golf Tour Championship Shishido Hills and the 2015 Japan Open. He has also won once on the Japan Challenge Tour in 2012.

In April 2018, Kodaira won the RBC Heritage, for his first victory on the PGA Tour, in just his 15th start. Players ranked in the world top 50 are automatically invited to that tournament, and Kodaira had been in the top 50 for most of the year.  He came from six strokes behind in the final round and posted a five-under 66 to sit in the clubhouse at −12, well before the leading groups finished. Kim Si-woo, who had the lead, faltered on the remaining holes and fell back into a playoff with Kodaira. Both players parred the first two extra holes, before Kodaira holed a 25-foot putt for birdie to win on the third extra hole. The win lifted Kodaira to a career high 27th in the world rankings.

Professional wins (10)

PGA Tour wins (1)

PGA Tour playoff record (1–0)

Japan Golf Tour wins (7)

 The Japan Open Golf Championship is also a Japan major championship.

Japan Golf Tour playoff record (1–1)

Japan Challenge Tour wins (2)

Results in major championships
Results not in chronological order in 2020.

CUT = missed the half-way cut
"T" = tied
NT = No tournament due to the COVID-19 pandemic

Results in The Players Championship

CUT = missed the halfway cut

Results in World Golf Championships
Results not in chronological order before 2015.

"T" = tied

Team appearances
Amateur
Eisenhower Trophy (representing Japan): 2010

Professional
World Cup (representing Japan): 2018
Amata Friendship Cup (representing Japan): 2018

References

External links

Japanese male golfers
Japan Golf Tour golfers
Golfers at the 2010 Asian Games
Asian Games competitors for Japan
Sportspeople from Tokyo
1989 births
Living people